Legacy: De Líder a Leyenda Tour EP is an EP by the Puerto Rican recording artist Yandel. It was released on August 25, 2014, by Sony Music Latin. The album has been released on music platforms such as iTunes, Spotify, Amazon and Google Play.

Album information
The album was released to help promote the De Líder a Leyenda Tour. It consists of five songs, fans could choose their favorite song from the EP through his website, and he would perform the winning song as a part of the tour's set list on October 4 at José Miguel Agrelot Coliseum in San Juan, Puerto Rico. Two songs were premiered online before the album's release, "Trepando Paredes" and the remix version of "Plakito", to which were added vocals from the Puerto Rican singer Farruko, both featuring the catchphrase "Legacy" at the intro. Neither of them were included, but they were included later on the Deluxe Edition of his 2015 live album Legacy: De Líder a Leyenda Tour, an advance of the Legacy EP, which was released on February 3, 2015.

Track listing
Source.

Charts

References

External links
Yandel's official website

2014 debut EPs
Yandel EPs
Spanish-language EPs
Sony Music Latin EPs